Tarac  may refer to:
 a karst rock-area island in Kornati archipelago in Croatia
 Mount Tarac, a volcanic mount adjacent to Mariveles Volcano in the Philippines
 Tarac Australia Limited, a South Australia company specialist in wine technologies